Victor Nuelant (born 2 March 1945) is a Belgian racing cyclist. He rode in the 1970 Tour de France.

References

External links
 

1945 births
Living people
Belgian male cyclists
Place of birth missing (living people)
20th-century Belgian people